Dysoxylum grande is a tree in the family Meliaceae. The specific epithet  is from the Latin meaning "large".

Description
The bark is greyish brown. The fragrant flowers are creamy-yellow.

Distribution and habitat
Dysoxylum grande is found in India, south China, Thailand and Malesia. Its habitat is rain forest from sea-level to  altitude.

References

grande
Flora of Assam (region)
Trees of China
Trees of Thailand
Trees of Malesia
Plants described in 1875